Jeppe Riber (born April 15, 1985 in Esbjerg) is a Danish handballer who played for the Danish league club Skjern Håndbold. He plays as a left winger.

External links
 Player info 

Danish male handball players
1985 births
Living people
People from Esbjerg
Sportspeople from the Region of Southern Denmark
21st-century Danish people